"Gravity" is a song by American musician John Mayer. It is written by Mayer and produced by Mayer and Steve Jordan. "Gravity" is featured on three of Mayer's releases: the 2005 live album Try! by the John Mayer Trio, his 2006 studio album Continuum, and his 2008 live album Where the Light Is: John Mayer Live in Los Angeles. In 2007, the song was released as the third single from Continuum.

Background and production
Mayer suggested in an interview with the magazine Performing Songwriter that "Gravity" was the song he was always trying to write, using the example of "Come Back to Bed" (from Heavier Things) as being an early attempt at "writing Gravity". Along with "Vultures", the song is one of only two songs featured on the John Mayer Trio's debut album, Try!, that carried over into the release of Continuum. Alicia Keys provides background vocals at the end of the song.

Personnel
John Mayer - singing, lead guitar
Pino Palladino - bass, backing vocals
Steve Jordan (drummer) - drums, percussion
Larry Goldings - Hammond B3 organ
Alicia Keys - Backing Vocals

Song meaning
In a concert performed in December 2005, Mayer explained the significance and meaning of the song:

Reception
Billboard called the single "an easygoing, bluesy number, convincingly conjuring the spirit of his idol Buddy Guy."

On February 22, 2007, "Gravity" entered Billboard's Hot 100 singles chart at #71; at that time, Mayer had two singles charting on the Hot 100 (the other song was "Waiting on the World to Change"). It also entered Billboard's Hot 100 Digital Songs Chart at #63

Grammy Awards performance

At the 49th Annual Grammy Awards on February 11, 2007, Mayer performed "Gravity" with Corinne Bailey Rae and John Legend as the end of a medley. The set began with Rae's "Like a Star", and continued with Legend's "Coming Home", before concluding with "Gravity".

Stevie Wonder introduced the trio's performance, and each artist performed some aspect of every song through the entire medley. For Rae's "Like a Star", Mayer performed various backing guitar licks, while during Legend's "Coming Home" he performed little. For "Gravity", both Rae and Legend performed backing vocals and Legend played piano.

At the ceremony, Mayer won Best Male Pop Vocal Performance for the first single from Continuum, "Waiting on the World to Change".

At the 51st Annual Grammy Awards, the live version of "Gravity" that appears on Mayer's Where The Light Is: John Mayer Live In Los Angeles won the award for Best Solo Rock Vocal Performance.

Cultural influence
The tune was #84 on Rolling Stone'''s list of the 100 Greatest Guitar Songs Of All Time.
The family of astronaut Pilot Charles O. Hobaugh chose "Gravity" as the wake-up call for the astronauts aboard the Space Shuttle Endeavour'' on August 11, 2007. (The wake-up call is a tradition for NASA spaceflights since the days of Project Gemini.)

Cover versions
 Overboard (Stranded, 2008)
Main Squeeze (available by searching the internet for Fsqq495jiYw, 2021)

Charts

Weekly charts

Year-end charts

Certifications

See also
2007 in music

References

External links
 
 "Gravity" lyrics, at Yahoo! Music

2007 singles
John Mayer songs
Songs written by John Mayer
Grammy Award for Best Solo Rock Vocal Performance
Sony BMG singles
Columbia Records singles
American soft rock songs
American soul songs